Shah Mardi may refer to:
 Shamardi
 Shahmoradi